Djibouti Airlines was an airline based in Djibouti, Djibouti. It operated regional scheduled and ad hoc charter services using wet leased aircraft out of its base at Djibouti-Ambouli International Airport.

History 
Djibouti Airlines was established on 1 February 1996 by former Puntavia director Moussa Rayaleh. It had its commercial transport license revoked on 30 July 2009.

Destinations

Fleet 

The Djibouti Airlines fleet included the following aircraft types (as of June 2009):

 Antonov An-12
 Antonov An-24RV
 Ilyushin Il-18
 Ilyushin Il-76

Accidents and incidents 
 On 17 March 2002 at 18:02 local time, a Djibouti Airlines Let L-410 Turbolet (registered J2-KBC) transport aircraft crashed into the Gulf of Aden shortly off the runway threshold of Djibouti-Ambouli International Airport, where it had attempted to land following a flight from Aden Adde International Airport. All four persons on board were killed.
 On 27 July 2007 at around 13:00 local time, a Djibouti Airlines Antonov An-26 cargo aircraft crash-landed on a field near Shinile, Ethiopia, resulting in the death of one out of the nine persons on board. The aircraft had just left Aba Tenna Dejazmach Yilma International Airport for a flight to Djibouti-Ambouli International Airport when one engine failed.

References 

Defunct airlines of Djibouti
Airlines established in 1996
Airlines disestablished in 2009
Companies based in Djibouti (city)